Massachusetts House of Representatives' 1st Suffolk district in the United States is one of 160 legislative districts included in the lower house of the Massachusetts General Court. It covers part of the city of Boston in Suffolk County. Democrat Adrian Madaro of East Boston has represented the district since 2015.

The current district geographic boundary overlaps with that of the Massachusetts Senate's 1st Suffolk and Middlesex district.

Representatives
 Wm. Deblois, circa 1858 
 Martin Griffin, circa 1859 
 George W. Parmenter, circa 1858-1859 
 Clarence P. Lovell, circa 1888 
 Charles T. Witt, circa 1888 
 Joseph Murley, circa 1908 
 Lewis McKie, circa 1908
 Edward Cox, circa 1918
 Edward Kelley, circa 1918
 Ceorce F. Murphy, circa 1920 
 Thomas A. Niland, circa 1920 
 Robert Dinsmore, circa 1923
 Thomas Winston, circa 1923
 Francis Irwin, circa 1935
 Thomas Barry, circa 1935
 Tony Centracchio, circa 1935
 Enrico Cappucci, circa 1945
 Francis Matera, circa 1945
 Manassah E. Bradley, circa 1951 
 Mario Umana, circa 1951 
 Michael Porrazzo, circa 1953
 George DiLorenzo, circa 1967
 Michael D'Avolio, circa 1967
 Emanuel Gus Serra, circa 1975 
 Tom Gallagher, 1980 – 1986
 Anthony Petruccelli, June 1999 – July 2007
 Carlo Basile, November 1, 2007 – January 7, 2015 
 Adrian C. Madaro, April 8, 2015-current

See also
 List of Massachusetts House of Representatives elections
 Other Suffolk County districts of the Massachusetts House of Representatives: 2nd, 3rd, 4th, 5th, 6th, 7th, 8th, 9th, 10th, 11th, 12th, 13th, 14th, 15th, 16th, 17th, 18th, 19th
 List of Massachusetts General Courts
 List of former districts of the Massachusetts House of Representatives

Images
Portraits of legislators

References

External links

 Ballotpedia
  (State House district information based on U.S. Census Bureau's American Community Survey).
 League of Women Voters of Boston

House
Government of Suffolk County, Massachusetts